Rohit Suchanti is an Indian television actor who portrayed Ramakant Modi in Saath Nibhana Saathiya, Ratan Singh in Rishta Likhenge Hum Naya and participated in Bigg Boss 12. He currently plays the lead role of Rishi Oberoi in Ekta Kapoor's Bhagya Lakshmi on Zee TV.

Career
Rohit Suchanti made his debut in television by acting in several episodic roles,he played the role of Dhruv in Pyaar Tune Kya Kiya 4 on 2014. In 2015, he got role of Rohit Agrawal in Warrior High and Vikram in Pyaar Tune Kya Kiya 5. He played the role of Abhay in Pyaar Tune Kya Kiya 7 in 2016.

In early 2017, he played Ramakant (Ricky) Modi in Saath Nibhaana Saathiya on Star Plus. Then he played Jai in ALTBalaji's Class of 2017. In September 2017, he joined Rishta Likhenge Hum Naya playing Ratan Maan Singh on Sony TV. In October 2018, he joined Bigg Boss 12 as the second wildcard entry. In 2019, he played Anshuman Sharma in Zee TV's Dil Yeh Ziddi Hai.

Currently, Suchanti is playing the lead role of Rishi Oberoi in the show titled Bhagya Lakshmi opposite Aishwarya Khare.

Filmography

Television

Special appearances

Web series

Music videos

Awards and nominations

References

External links
 
 

Living people
1996 births
Male actors in Hindi television
Indian male television actors
Indian male soap opera actors
21st-century Indian male actors
Male actors from Bihar
Indian male models
Bigg Boss (Hindi TV series) contestants